Glaphyrae was a town of Magnesia in ancient Thessaly, mentioned by Homer in the Catalogue of Ships along with Boebe and Iolcus After which, the name does not subsequently occur in history. This identification is accepted by modern scholars. As of Leake's visit in the 19th century, the entire circuit of the citadel on the summit of the hill could be traced, and on its lower side part of the wall was still standing.

References

Populated places in ancient Thessaly
Former populated places in Greece
Ancient Greek archaeological sites in Thessaly
Locations in the Iliad
Ancient Magnesia